Katie Griffiths (born 6 April 1989) is an English actress, known for portraying the role of Chlo Grainger on the BBC school-based drama series Waterloo Road (2006–2009, 2023).

Career 
Griffiths joined Stage 84, the Yorkshire School of Performing Arts aged 12. In 2006, she began appearing in the BBC One school-based drama Waterloo Road from the first ever episode, broadcast on 9 March 2006, and made her last appearance in 2009. She's appeared opposite Nicholas Hoult as Alice in the BAFTA nominated television film Coming Down The Mountain; she has also appeared in multiple episodes of Casualty and Doctors and in Paradox in 2009 as Leah Holt. Since January 2010 she has appeared in two episodes of the Only Fools and Horses prequel Rock & Chips as Glenda  and as Suzy in the Prime Suspect prequel Prime Suspect 1973 (also known as Prime Suspect: Tennison). She also starred opposite Kevin Costner and Bill Paxton in the multi Emmy Award winning mini-series Hatfields & McCoys portraying Alifair McCoy. In 2020, she appeared in another episode of the BBC soap opera Doctors as Ali Brinkshaw.

In 2023, Griffiths reprised her role as Chlo in Waterloo Road for one episode, in which the character was killed off.

Filmography

References

External links 

1989 births
Living people
English television actresses
English child actresses
People from Craven District
People from Yorkshire
20th-century English actresses
21st-century English actresses